Escapist may refer to:

Escapist, a person engaged in the act of escapism
Escapist fiction

Books
The Escapists, novel by Alexander Fullerton 1972

Comics and games
The Escapist (website), a role-playing-games advocacy website
The Escapist (magazine), an online magazine
The Escapist (character), a comic book character
The Escapists, a 2015 video game

Film and TV
The Escapist (1983 film), starring escape artist Bill Shirk
The Escapist (2002 film), directed by Gillies MacKinnon
The Escapist (2008 film), directed by Rupert Wyatt

Music
The Escapist (album) a 1996 album by Stephen Cummings
"The Escapist" (1998), an album by Phil Western
"The Escapist", hidden track on Coldplay's 2008 album Viva la Vida or Death and All His Friends
"The Escapist", a single from The Streets' 2008 album Everything Is Borrowed 
"Escapist", a song by Nightwish on their album Dark Passion Play

See also
Escapism (disambiguation)
Escapist fiction
Escapologist
New Escapologist